Aliyu Yau Adam (born 7 May 2000) is a Nigerian football midfielder who plays for Bnei Yehuda. He was a squad member for the 2019 Africa U-23 Cup of Nations.

References

External links

2000 births
Living people
People from Jos
Nigerian footballers
FK Spartaks Jūrmala players
FC Sfîntul Gheorghe players
Hapoel Acre F.C. players
Bnei Yehuda Tel Aviv F.C. players
Latvian Higher League players
Moldovan Super Liga players
Liga Leumit players
Nigerian expatriate footballers
Expatriate footballers in Latvia
Expatriate footballers in Moldova
Expatriate footballers in Israel
Nigerian expatriate sportspeople in Latvia
Nigerian expatriate sportspeople in Moldova
Nigerian expatriate sportspeople in Israel
Association football midfielders
Nigeria youth international footballers